The 18th constituency of the Nord is a French legislative constituency in the Nord département.

Description

Nord's 18th constituency is seated in the town on Cambrai.

Politically the seat  swung between left and right during the late 20th century, it has however been held by conservatives François-Xavier Villain and Guy Bricout since 2002.

Historic Representation

Election results

2022

2017

2012

 
 
 
 
|-
| colspan="8" bgcolor="#E9E9E9"|
|-

2007

 
 
 
 
 
|-
| colspan="8" bgcolor="#E9E9E9"|
|-

2002

 
 
 
 
 
|-
| colspan="8" bgcolor="#E9E9E9"|
|-

1997

 
 
 
 
 
 
 
|-
| colspan="8" bgcolor="#E9E9E9"|
|-

Sources
 Official results of French elections from 1998: 

18